Smokin' is a Smokey Robinson live album released in 1978.

Track listing
"The Tracks of My Tears"
"Love So Fine"
"Baby That's Backatcha"
"The Agony and the Ecstasy"
"Quiet Storm" (Dialogue)
"Why You Wanna See My Bad Side"
"Daylight and Darkness"
"Madam X"
"The Tears of a Clown"
"Bad Girl/You Can Depend on Me"
"Here I Go Again"
"Mickey's Monkey"
"You Really Got a Hold on Me"
"Shoe Soul"
"I Second That Emotion"
"Ooo Baby Baby"
"Vitamin U"
"Baby Come Close"

Personnel
 Smokey Robinson – lead vocals
 Reginald "Sonny" Burke – keyboards
 Ron Rancifer – keyboards
 Marv Tarplin – guitar
 Wah Wah Watson – guitar
 James Jamerson – bass guitar
 Wayne Tweed – bass guitar
 Scotty Harris – drums
 James "Alibe" Sledge – congas, backing vocals
 Ivory Stone Davis – kettledrums, timpani, backing vocals 
 Fred Smith – saxophone, flute
 Michael Jacobsen – saxophone, cello
 Patricia Henley – backing vocals

Production
 Producers – Smokey Robinson (All tracks); Berry Gordy, Mike and Brenda Sutton (Track 15).
 Recording Engineers – Wally Heider and Russ Terrana
 Sound Engineers – Michael Lizzio and Danny Muldoon.
 Mixing – Michael Lizzio and Smokey Robinson
 Mix Assistant – Ernestine Madison 
 Sound Coordinator – Randy Dunlap
 Mastered by Jack Andrews
 Mixed and Mastered at Motown Recording Studios (Los Angeles, CA).
 Product Manager – Brenda M. Boyce
 Art Direction and Design – Norm Ung
 Lettering – Debbie Ross
 Photography – Bob Holland (front cover) and Neil Zlozower (back cover/inside).
 Wardrobe Coordinator – Barbara Ramsey

References

Smokey Robinson albums
Albums produced by Smokey Robinson
1978 live albums
Motown live albums